Kurt Bryan Dela Vega Barbosa (born June 8, 1999) is a Filipino taekwondo athlete who competed in the 2020 Summer Olympics in Tokyo.

Career

College
Barbosa, a student of the National University, has competed in the University Athletic Association of the Philippines (UAAP). In 2018 during UAAP Season 81, Barbosa competing in the finweight category was named Rookie Player of the Year and Most Valuable Player for the UAAP's taekwondo tournament.

National team
Kurt Barbosa, a native of Bangued, Abra, was scouted for the Philippine national team during his participation in the Philippine National Games where he represented his home province, and became part of the Philippine Taekwondo Association's grassroots program. Barbosa became part of the national team in 2019 and was placed under the tutelage of coach Carlos Padilla.

He participated in the 2019 World Taekwondo Championships in the men's finweight category, although he failed to advance from the Round of 64 after his Thai opponent Ramnarong Sawekwiharee eliminated him from the tournament.

Barbosa competed at the 2019 Southeast Asian Games, which was hosted at home in the Philippines. He clinched a gold medal for the host delegation in taekwondo by besting the men's -54 kg category.

2020 Summer Olympics
Barbosa qualified for the 2020 Summer Olympics in Tokyo, which was delayed by a year due to the COVID-19 pandemic, through the 2021 Asian Qualification Tournament in Amman, Jordan. He qualified for the Olympics through a top two finish, by besting Jordanian athlete Zaid Alhalawani despite trailing behind his opponent 12 seconds prior to the end of their match. He is the first Filipino taekwondo athlete to qualify since Tshomlee Go who competed in the 2008 Summer Olympics

Competing in the Men's −58 kg, Barbosa was scheduled to fight against top-ranked South Korean athlete Jang Jun, who also won gold in the 2019 World Taekwondo Championships, in the Round of 16. Barbosa suffered a defeat, but still could have figure in the repechage to potentially clinch a bronze medal if Jang progressed all the way to the final. However Jang lost to Mohamed Khalil Jendoubi of Tunisia in the semifinal, ending Barbosa's Olympic medal bid.

Personal life
Kurt Bryan Barbosa has two younger siblings, Kurt Maverick, being the second oldest who is also a taekwondo athlete  and Sheena Angel, the youngest who is an aspiring dancer.

References

Competitors at the 2019 Southeast Asian Games
Southeast Asian Games gold medalists for the Philippines
Southeast Asian Games competitors for the Philippines
Southeast Asian Games medalists in taekwondo
University Athletic Association of the Philippines players
National University (Philippines) alumni
Filipino taekwondo practitioners
Living people
Taekwondo practitioners at the 2020 Summer Olympics
1999 births
People from Abra (province)
Competitors at the 2021 Southeast Asian Games
Olympic taekwondo practitioners of the Philippines
21st-century Filipino people